Damës is a village in and the seat of the former Fratar municipality, Fier County, Albania. At the 2015 local government reform it became part of the municipality Mallakastër.

References

Map of the municipality

Populated places in Mallakastër
Villages in Fier County